Histone H2B type F-S is a protein that in humans is encoded by the H2BC12L gene.

References

Further reading